2AY is an Australian classic hits and talk radio formatted AM radio station, broadcasting to Albury, New South Wales and the surrounding areas of Southwest New South Wales and North East Victoria. It is owned and operated by ACE Radio.

History

2AY Albury was started by AWA Limited, and opened on 17 December 1930.

In 2005, 2AY and sister station 104.9 Star FM were purchased by DMG Radio Australia. Later in 2005, Macquarie Regional RadioWorks, through its purchase of most DMG Radio Australia's regional assets, owned 2AY, Star FM, and former cross-town rival 105.7 The River. Due to cross media ownership laws limiting the number of radio stations owned by one company in a market to two, Macquarie was required to sell one station. 2AY was sold in September to Ace Radio.

References

External links
 
 2AY at Heritage Radio Foundation

Radio stations in New South Wales
Radio stations established in 1930
Classic hits radio stations in Australia
Ace Radio